Isa-Beg Ishaković (1439–70) was an Ottoman Bosnian general and the governor of the Sanjak of Bosnia for most of his career. Of Bosnian noble origin, he was recruited after being held hostage by the Ottomans. He was a provincial governor during the 1450s and 1460s, first in charge of the Sanjak of Skopje, and then the Sanjak of Bosnia. He was instrumental in the Ottoman conquests in the region, and was one of the Sultan's most trusted generals.

Origin
There are two main theories about his father identity:
Ishak Hranić Kosača, the brother of Bosnian nobleman Stjepan Vukčić Kosača, who was sent to the sultan Mehmed II as hostage and guarantee of Kosača's loyalty. After being adopted by Pasha Jigit Bey he was converted into Islam and had by contemporary measures a significant military and political career within the Ottoman Empire. His patronymic Hranić indicates that his father's name was Hrana, which means that he was not Stjepan's brother but that Ishak Bey Hranić was Sandalj Hranić's brother.
Ishak Hranić/Hranušić, taken prisoner when the akinci intruded a holding of the Pavlović noble family (lords of eastern Bosnia, including the župa of Vrhbosna). He proved himself exceptionally able while a prisoner, so the akinci leader freed him (prompted him to leave the property, as well as his title).

Biography
Isa Beg Ishaković conquered Hodidjed fortress in 1435, after it had been briefly reconquered by Matko Talovac in 1434.

Isa-Beg Ishaković was appointed as sanjak-bey (provincial governor) of the Sanjak of Skopje in the spring of 1439, in place of his father, Ishak-Beg, who was sent to lead military actions in Serbia. He was then appointed the sanjak-bey of Bosnia, briefly in 1463, and then from 1464 to 1470.

As governor of the province of Bosnia, Isa-Beg assured its future prosperity. He founded Sarajevo in 1461 in the former Bosnian province of Vrhbosna. Between then and 1463 he built the core of the city's Old Town district, including a mosque, a closed marketplace, a public bath, a hostel, and the Governor's castle (Saray), which gave the city its present name. There he built a mosque, a marketplace, a public bath, a hostel, and a compound. He is also responsible for establishing a number of other cities and towns in the region.

Ishaković built many important buildings part of the Old Bazaar in Skopje, like the Čifte Hammam, Kapan Han, Ishak Bey Mosque (dedicated to his father Ishak-Beg, also known as Isaklija or Aladža), the madrasa (Islamic school) and library (within Isak-Beg's Mosque, one of the first Islamic libraries in Europe), and many other buildings that belonged to his endowment (waqf). 

Ishaković participated in ransom slavery in 1470 when he ransomed a highly positioned Ottoman official named Mustafa by releasing the wife of Croatian nobleman Ivan Marković and paying 500 ducats to Ragusan Frančesko Micalović, the agent in this transaction.

Family tree
After Franz Babinger in the Encyclopedia of Islam:

Annotations
Name: He is referred to as Isa-Beg Ishaković in most Serbo-Croatian sources. Some sources spell his patronymic "Isaković". Based on his possible origins, he may be referred to as Isa-beg Ishaković Hranić or Isa-beg Ishaković Hranušić.

References

Sources

 Amir Isajbegović, Kuća onih što sade dud - rekonstrukcija, Zagreb 2022. ISBN 978-953-49425-0-5

External links
Text from Historical Archive of Sarajevo
Krajište Isa-bega Ishakovića: Zbirni katastarski popis iz 1455 godine. - List of properties of Isa-Beg Isaković in 1455

Bosnia and Herzegovina generals
Ottoman generals
Ottoman Bosnian nobility
15th-century people from the Ottoman Empire
People from the Ottoman Empire of Bosnian descent
Bosniak history
15th-century Bosnian people
Kosača noble family
Ottoman governors of Bosnia
Pavlović noble family
Bosnian Muslims from the Ottoman Empire